Passdalen is a valley in Nordenskiöld Land at Spitsbergen, Svalbard. The valley has a length of about three kilometres, and extends westwards from Semmeldalen towards Grøndalspasset. It is located north of Sinaiberget and south of Passfjellet.

References

Valleys of Spitsbergen